The Servbot, known as Kobun (コブン) in Japan, is a type of fictional sentient robot that appears in an assortment of video games and associated media developed and published by Capcom. The Servbot originated in the 1997 title Mega Man Legends, and appears in all media within the sub-series of the same name. Within series fiction, Servbots are a group of childlike robots who follow their creator, the pirate Tron Bonne, as her loyal but incompetent henchmen. The Servbots serve as a source of comic relief for the majority of their appearances.

Considered to be the most enduring aspect of the Legends series by critics, Servbots have made extensive appearances outside of the Mega Man Legends series, where they often presented as mascots or representatives of the series in crossover games. Servbot iconography is also a staple feature in the Dead Rising series. Servbots have appeared in a number of official promotional material and merchandise released by Capcom, and have also been subject to fan labor efforts.

Characteristics
Servbots are a group of diminutive robots with yellow heads and blue bodies, with their overall design resembling Lego minifigures. Created by the pirate Tron Bonne, they are characterized as unquestioningly loyal followers who share a parent-child relationship with her. They are depicted as childlike in nature, lacking the capacity to understand the concept of morality or the illegality of the criminal actions they are tasked with performing. Each Servbot fulfills a designated role, ranging from domestic chores to combat abilities. While small in size, the Servbots are shown to be effective combatants and are important to the exploits of Tron Bonne and her family as pirates. A frequent running gag within the series involve the incompetence or ineptitude of various Servbot units, leading to disastrous outcomes and consequently punishment from Tron. In spite of their inorganic nature, Servbots are depicted in series canon as being capable of consuming human food, such as curry.

Appearances

Mega Man Legends
Servbots first appear in 1997's Mega Man Legends as antagonists under the command of Tron Bonne, who sends them to rob banks and cause mischief. In The Misadventures of Tron Bonne, a prequel to the first Mega Man Legends, Tron commands a total number of 40 Servbots created by her, although there is a hidden 41st Servbot which has escaped her attention. The Servbots assist the Bonne family with the management of their airship, the Gesellschaft, and assist Tron with reaching places and performing maneuvers too delicate for her bulky armor suit. The management and training of Servbot units by players form an essential gameplay element of The Misadventures of Tron Bonne. By the events of Mega Man Legends 2, the Servbots have developed a somewhat amicable relationship with Mega Man Volnutt, the main character and protagonist of the Mega Man Legends series, as a result of the improved relations between Volnutt and Tron Bonne.

Other appearances 
The Servbot is the titular character, under its original Japanese name Kobun, of a series of Japan-exclusive mobile spin-off titles of the Legends series released in the 2000s. Servbot characters have appeared in the manga adaptations of the Mega Man Legends series.

The Servbot's iconography has a prominent presence in the Dead Rising series as a form of intertextual reference: for example, the series' protagonists could wear in-game items like helmets with Servbot faces. The Servbots' appearances in other games developed by Capcom include Bionic Commando, Street Fighter X Tekken, and Onimusha 3: Demon Siege. 

Servbots appear as playable or supporting characters in crossover games such as the Marvel vs. Capcom series, Project X Zone, and Namco x Capcom. The Servbot is incorporated into Dead Rising series protagonist Frank West's moveset in the latter's crossover fighting game appearances.

Cultural impact

Servbots are recognized by critics as the most memorable or recognizable aspect of the Mega Man Legends series. In response to a December 2012 announcement by the Japanese Aerospace Exploration Agency (JAXA) about plans to send a 13-inch-tall humanoid robot to the International Space Station (ISS) during the following year to serve as assistants for human astronauts to carry out experiments on the station, Ian Chant from The Mary Sue compared the robot's concept and role to the Servbot, which he believed to be a close analog. Servbots have been subject to various fan labor activities, such as cosplay, and a short fan film. Following the cancellation of Mega Man Legends 3, two fans developed a browser-based fangame which recreated content from the Servbot mission in the cancelled game's prototype version.

Promotion and merchandise
Capcom have used the Servbot character for various promotional purposes. The company gave away free Servbot-themed pudding to attendees at the 2000 Tokyo Game Show. In 2009, Capcom released a line of limited series Servbot-themed coffee mugs, which were only distributed in South Korea. The mugs were personally signed by Servbot creator Keiji Inafune, and contain a drawing of Mega Man on the underside. To promote the release of Dead Rising 2, the PlayStation Home service released an update in September 2010 which allowed players to acquire a Servbot helmet from the PlayStation Home Mall for their avatars. Servbot figures were placed alongside a statue of Mega Man at the lobby or reception area of Capcom's Tokyo branch office from 2009 until 2011, when they were replaced by statues of Felynes from the Monster Hunter franchise.
 
The Servbot was the first line of Bobble Budd branded figures to be produced by Multiverse Studios. According to creative director Alan Ning, it was one of several concepts that was originally pitched to retailers, which Capcom was quick to accept. Originally sold at San Diego Comic-Con 2010 and later on the Capcom Store, the bobblehead figures became a sales hit and quickly sold out, which encouraged Multiverse to produce more Bobble Budd figures for licensing and promotional work.
Other noteworthy Servbot-themed merchandise include a collector’s pin featuring Tron Bonne riding a Servbot mecha, and plush toys.

Critical reception
Writing for Destructoid, Ben Davis considered the Servbots, along with the Bonne family, as the best aspects of the Mega Man Legends series due to their comical antics, though he felt bad about beating up Servbot characters due to their "adorable" appearance. He praised a story arc which made a gag out of the Servbots' desire to seek redemption by opening a restaurant, which is misinterpreted as a bank-robbing operation by other characters. Mike Fahey from Kotaku expressed a desire for a game which features Servbots dressed up in various Mega Man-themed power armor, and to see more merchandise about Servbots being produced. In a retrospective assessment of the Mega Man Legends series, Neil Foster noted that the development and release of The Misadventures of Tron Bonne was due to the breakout popularity Tron Bonne and the Servbots enjoyed from the first Mega Man Legends. He felt that the Servbots overshadow Tron Bonne at multiple points and she is presented as more reactionary to their antics and inquiries. For Foster, the Servbots are the source of many of The Misadventures of Tron Bonne gleeful moments, and that its gameplay mechanics are a showcase of how focused the development team was into spotlighting Servbots as the game's real stars.

References

See also 
Minions (Despicable Me), a similar group of yellow childlike henchmen.
 

Capcom antagonists
Capcom protagonists
Corporate mascots
Dead Rising
Fictional henchmen in video games
Mascots introduced in 1997
Mega Man Legends
Robot characters in video games
Video game characters introduced in 1997
Video game mascots
Video game sidekicks